Estadistas Unidos was a non-partisan organization created by don Luis A. Ferré in January, 1967 after the Statehood Republican Party (SRP), of which he was its long-time gubernatorial candidate, met at the San Jerónimo Hilton hotel in San Juan, Puerto Rico and refused to defend the statehood option in the upcoming July 27 political status plebiscite convened by the pro-status quo Popular Democratic Party (PDP)-dominated Legislature.

Secretly meeting at the Puerto Rico Bar Association or Colegio de Abogados de Puerto Rico headquarters, Estadistas Unidos was organized in weeks and, against overwhelming odds, was able to launch Puerto Rico's first modern, media-based political campaign which resulted in a dramatic increase in votes for statehood (39%) in the plebiscite, in spite of the electoral boycott called for by the Statehood Republican Party.

In addition to Ferré, other leaders of Estadistas Unidos included future Governor Carlos Romero Barceló, future San Juan Mayor Hernán Padilla, future Senator José Menéndez Monroig, and future Senator Justo Méndez.  Among statehood leaders who remained loyal to the SRP were party president Miguel A. García Méndez, future House Speaker Pro Tem José Granados and future Senate Vice President Orlando Parga, Jr.

On August 20, 1967, organization leaders met at a basketball arena in Carolina, Puerto Rico for the purpose of dissolving the organization, which they did, but immediately approved a motion to found a new political party, which would be known as the New Progressive Party (NPP), which went on to win the next general election, breaking the PDP's 28-year-long stranglehold on political power, electing Ferré as the first pro-statehood governor.  Estadistas Unidos is, thus, deemed to be the precursor of the NPP.

References

1967 establishments in Puerto Rico
1967 disestablishments in Puerto Rico
Political history of Puerto Rico